Ellery Huntington may refer to:

 Ellery Huntington Sr. (c. 1865 – 1945), American college athletics coach, administrator, and professor, head basketball coach at Colgate University (1900–1913)
 Ellery Huntington Jr. (1893–1987), American football player and coach, head football coach at Colgate University (1919–1921), College Football Hall of Fame inductee, son of the former